David L. Elliott (born July 4, 1952) is an American football coach and former player.  He served as the head football coach at Morningside College in Sioux City, Iowa from 1996 until 2000, compiling a record of 7–48.  Elliott played college football at the University of Michigan.  He was signed by the Montreal Alouettes of the Canadian Football League (CFL) in 1975.  Elliott is the son of Pete Elliott (1926–2013).

Head coaching record

References

1952 births
Living people
American football defensive backs
Ashland Eagles football coaches
Central Connecticut Blue Devils football coaches
Iowa State Cyclones football coaches
Miami Hurricanes football coaches
Michigan Wolverines football coaches
Michigan Wolverines football players
Morningside Mustangs football coaches
Montreal Alouettes players
Toledo Rockets football coaches
Washington State Cougars football coaches
Winona State Warriors football coaches
Youngstown State Penguins football coaches